The following is a list of the listed buildings in Skåne County, Sweden.

Bjuv Municipality

Burlöv Municipality

Båstad Municipality

Eslöv Municipality

Helsingborg Municipality

Hässleholm Municipality

Höganäs Municipality

Höör Municipality

Klippan Municipality

Kristianstad Municipality

Kävlinge Municipality

Landskrona Municipality

Lomma Municipality

Lund Municipality

Malmö Municipality

Osby Municipality

Simrishamn Municipality

Sjöbo Municipality

Skurup Municipality

Svalöv Municipality

Svedala Municipality

Tomelilla Municipality

Trelleborg Municipality

Vellinge Municipality

Ystad Municipality

Ängelholm Municipality

Åstorp Municipality

Örkelljunga Municipality

Östra Göinge Municipality

External links

  Bebyggelseregistret

Listed buildings in Sweden